Nigel Luuk van Oostrum (born 19 September 1990) is a British-Dutch professional basketball player who last played for Landstede Hammers of the BNXT League.

College career 
Van Oostrum played college basketball with the Franklin Pierce Ravens in the NCAA Division II.

Professional career
Van Oostrum started his professional career with Den Helder Kings of the Dutch Basketball League (DBL). When that club was dissolved in December 2014, he signed with Aris Leeuwarden.

In July 2016, Van Oostrum joined Landstede Basketbal. On 5 October 2017, he won his first trophy with Landstede after the club won the Dutch Basketball Supercup. In the 2018–19 season, Van Oostrum was the captain of the Landstede team that won the club's first national championship. In the following 2019–20 season, he played together with his brother Devon van Oostrum on the Hammers.

In 2022, Van Oostrum was diagnosed to have a brain tumor and underwent surgery.

On 30 April 2022, Van Oostrum's number 7 was retired by the Hammers.

International career
Van Oostrum played for the England national basketball team at the U18 European Championship for Men.

Personal
Van Oostrum is the son of Duco van Oostrum, who played basketball at Ymir, the precursor of Aris Leeuwarden and since 1995 teaches at Sheffield University. Nigel is the older brother of Devon and Sam, both professional players as well.

References

1990 births
Living people
Aris Leeuwarden players
British men's basketball players
Den Helder Kings players
Dutch Basketball League players
Dutch men's basketball players
Franklin Pierce Ravens men's basketball players
Landstede Hammers players
Point guards
Shooting guards
Basketball players from Houston
Sportspeople from Sheffield